Hemidactylus isolepis, also known as the scaly leaf-toed gecko or uniform-scaled gecko, is a species of gecko. It is found in Ethiopia, Somalia, Kenya, and probably in Sudan.

References

Hemidactylus
Reptiles of Ethiopia
Reptiles of Kenya
Reptiles of Somalia
Reptiles described in 1895
Taxa named by George Albert Boulenger